Ben Jones (born 7 July 1992, Wrexham) is a Welsh footballer with who made several appearances in The Football League with Chester City during his first year as an apprentice at the club. He is currently plays for Flint Town United.

The forward made his debut as a late substitute for Richie Partridge in Chester's 3–1 home loss to Chesterfield on 17 January 2009, before replacing the same player when Chester drew 1–1 at Lincoln City the following week. He became a regular member of Chester's matchday squad in the closing stages of the season, which ended in relegation from Football League Two.

Before joining Chester, Jones was with Preston North End. A former pupil at Connah's Quay High School, Jones was a product of the Flintshire Schoolboys team that has previously produced stars such as Ian Rush and Michael Owen.

On 26 March he joined Colwyn Bay along with fellow former Chester City player Glenn Rule.

In October 2010 he joined Flint Town United and he scored on his debut on 9 October 2010 in the ninth minute in a 5–0 win over Rhayader Town.

External links

Player stats from football.co.uk

References

1992 births
Living people
Welsh footballers
English Football League players
Association football forwards
Footballers from Wrexham
Chester City F.C. players
Flint Town United F.C. players
Colwyn Bay F.C. players